Hassan Ibrahim (born 1928) is a retired Jordanian Ambassador.

Career
From 1952 to 1953 he was Teacher in Kuwait Schools.
From 1953 to 1954 he was Clerk Ministry of Economy.
From 1954 to 1955 he was Chief Clerk in the Ministry of Finance.
From 1956 to 1959 he was employed from Civil Service commission.
From 1959 to 1961 he was First Secretary  in the Ministry of Foreign Affairs.
From 1961 to 1963 he was Adviser in the Ministry of Foreign Affairs.
From 1965 to 1968 he was Minister Plenipotentiary in Cairo (Egypt).
From 1968 to 1969 he was ambassador to the Council of Arab Economic Unity. 
From 1969 to 1973 he was ambassador in Moscow (Soviet Union).
In 1973 he was Ambassador, Head of Political Department in Ministry of Foreign Affairs.
From 1973 to 1976 he was Secretary General of Ministry of Foreign Affairs.
In 1976 he was Minister of State for Foreign Affairs and Minister of Reconstruction and Development.
In 1979 he was Minister of State.
In 1980 he was Minister of the Occupied Territories Affairs.

References

1928 births
Living people
Jordanian expatriates in the Soviet Union
Jordanian educators
Jordanian expatriates in Kuwait
Jordanian expatriates in Egypt
American University of Beirut alumni
New York University alumni
Jordanian expatriates in the United States